Myctophum is a genus of lanternfishes, some species of which, such as M. punctatum are noted for having the Stylophthalmine trait in their larval form.

Species 
There are currently 16 recognized species in this genus:
 Myctophum affine (Lütken, 1892) (Metallic lantern fish)
 Myctophum asperum J. Richardson, 1845 (Prickly lanternfish)
 Myctophum aurolaternatum Garman, 1899 (Golden lanternfish)
 Myctophum brachygnathum (Bleeker, 1856) (Short-jawed lanternfish)
 Myctophum fissunovi Becker & Borodulina, 1971
 Myctophum indicum (F. Day, 1877)
 Myctophum lunatum Becker & Borodulina, 1978
 Myctophum lychnobium Bolin, 1946
 Myctophum nitidulum Garman, 1899 (Pearly lanternfish)
 Myctophum obtusirostre Tåning, 1928 (Bluntsnout lanternfish)
 Myctophum orientale (C. H. Gilbert, 1913) (Oriental lanternfish)
 Myctophum ovcharovi Tsarin, 1993
 Myctophum phengodes (Lütken, 1892) (Bright lanternfish)
 Myctophum punctatum Rafinesque, 1810 (Spotted lanternfish)
 Myctophum selenops Tåning, 1928 (Wisner's lantern fish)
 Myctophum spinosum (Steindachner, 1867) (Spiny lantern fish)

See also
Stylophthalmus

References

 http://data.gbif.org/species/browse/taxon/11333249

Myctophidae
Extant Miocene first appearances
Taxa named by Constantine Samuel Rafinesque
Marine fish genera